"Hey Now (Think I Got a Feeling)" is the first single from the album The Neon by Erasure and was released on June 4, 2020. The track is upbeat similar to their older 80's songs and has gotten positive reviews. The song stayed in the BBC Radio 2 A list for 4 weeks and it was one of the most popular songs aired on UK radio in June and July 2020.

Background 
Recorded during the Covid-19 pandemic lockdown, the vocals were recorded by Andy Bell and sent to Vince Clarke to do the music in Atlanta. The final mix was created in London in 2020. The track was debuted on BBC radio 2 on June 4, 2020.

A video for the song was also released that features neon writings of the lyrics and imagery, but does not contain the band members.

Andy Bell said that "It's definitely a call-to-arms song.. I always felt you can be very spiritual, you don't have to be affiliated to any religion at all. You can take the best bits of whichever religion or philosophy you want to. I think generally I'm an optimist."

In July 2021, the band announced the remix album Neon (remixed), which features remixes of the track.

Reception 
Newsweek said: "The euphoric, danceable lead-off single "Hey Now (Think I Got a Feeling)" hearkens to the music by the late American disco artist Sylvester—as reflected by such lines as "Walk through the city, singing hallelujah/Wish for a lover's touch.""

The Guardian said: "Hey Now (Think I Got a Feeling) finds Bell beating the darkened city streets again, mildly off his box, looking for love and finding only empty hedonism, Clarke’s vintage synth-scape cascading around him like sodium glow. The sound of new-old Erasure can’t help but pale by comparison as the old-old classics drop – Who Needs Love Like That, Blue Savannah and A Little Respect in the first half-hour alone – but they remain a band who have never lost their essence."

PopMatters said: "The familiar warm shower of buoyant electronic beats evokes all the power of those dancefloors currently denied us (check out the video)."

Glorious Noise said: "nobody makes dance music quite like Andy Bell and Vince Clarke who have been cranking out undeniable jams for 35 years."

Credits 
"Hey Now (Think I Got A Feeling)" is written by Vince Clarke and Andy Bell .

Additional info 
On December 4, 2020, The Neon Singles was released, containing in physical format the three singles taken from the album The Neon ː Hey Now (Think I Got A Feeling), Nerves of Steel and Fallen Angel.

Remixes 

 Hey Now (Think I Got A Feeling) (Phillip George Remix Edit)
 Hey Now (Think I Got A Feeling) (Daybreakers Remix Edit)
 Hey Now (Think I Got A Feeling) (Nimmo Remix Edit)
 Hey Now (Think I Got A Feeling) (Phillip George Remix)
 Hey Now (Think I Got A Feeling) (Daybreakers Remix)
 Hey Now (Think I Got A Feeling) (Nimmo Remix)

References 

2020 songs
Erasure songs
Songs written by Vince Clarke
Songs written by Andy Bell (singer)